Lucy Marinkovich (born 1989) is a New Zealand dancer and choreographer. She is the artistic director and choreographer of Wellington-based performing arts group Borderline Arts Ensemble.

Biography 
Marinkovich was born in Wellington and began dance lessons at the age of five with Deirdre Tarrant. Marinkovich studied contemporary dance at the New Zealand School of Dance, graduating in 2009. While a student, she studied short courses at P.A.R.T.S in Belgium, Batsheva Dance Company in Israel and worked as a research assistant for Rosemary Martin in Ramallah, Palestine. She also concurrently studied for a bachelor's degree in English literature by distance with Massey University.

Marinkovich started dancing and modelling with the World of Wearable Art competitions in 2005 and performed with the organisation for ten years, including in their performance at the Hong Kong Arts Festival in 2012. In 2010, Marinkovich joined Footnote Dance Company and danced with the company nationally and internationally for several years.

In 2014, Marinkovich received the Creative New Zealand Tup Lang Choreographic Award. She choreographed productions at INSTINC Art Gallery Singapore and Rimbun Dahan in Kuala Lumpur, Malaysia. In 2018, Marinkovich was appointed dance educator for the Royal New Zealand Ballet, delivering the company's education and community events. She has also worked for the New Zealand School of Dance as a choreographer.

In 2018 she was awarded the Harriet Friedlander New York Residency from the Arts Foundation of New Zealand. In 2021, Marinkovich ran a programme in Dunedin teaching people living with Parkinson's disease to dance.

References 

1989 births
Living people
21st-century New Zealand dancers
New Zealand choreographers
New Zealand School of Dance alumni
Massey University alumni